Daniel Justin Fairbanks (born 1956) is an American biologist who was formerly a dean of Undergraduate Education at Brigham Young University (BYU).  He is a specialist in biology who has written books on the subject.

Early life and education
Fairbanks is a great-grandson of John B. Fairbanks, an artist from Utah. Fairbanks received his undergraduate education at BYU.  As a young man he served as a missionary for the Church of Jesus Christ of Latter-day Saints (LDS Church).

Career
Fairbanks has been on the faculty of BYU since 1988. Besides being a biology professor he has served as head of the University Honors Program and associate dean of General Education and Honors.

Fairbanks has also served as a visiting professor at Universidade Estadual de Londrina and Southern Virginia University.

Fairbanks is also a sculptor who has works in some museum collections.

Fairbanks is currently Dean of the College of Health and Science at Utah Valley University in Orem, Utah.

Fairbanks is also an author. Some of his works include Genetics: The Continunity of Life, Relics of Eden: The Powerful Evidence of Evolution in Human DNA, a very accessible book for non-specialist in genetics readers, Ending the Mendel-Fisher Controversy, and Shrubland Ecosystem Genetics and Biodiversity: Proceedings of a Conference.

Bibliography

References

External links

Announcement of Appointment as a dean
BYU bio
BYU devotional address
New BYU dean 'Renaissance Man' (2005)
Current standing at UVU
A list of some of his publications

1956 births
Brigham Young University alumni
Brigham Young University faculty
People from Provo, Utah
Southern Virginia University faculty
Living people
American Mormon missionaries
20th-century Mormon missionaries
20th-century American sculptors
20th-century male artists
American male sculptors
American male writers
21st-century American biologists
Latter Day Saints from Utah
Utah Valley University faculty